Eilabun ( Ailabun) is an Arab Christian village located in the Beit Netofa Valley around  south-west of Safed in northern Galilee between Nazareth and the Sea of Galilee. In 1973, Eilabun was granted local council status by the Israeli government.

Etymology
According to the Survey of Western Palestine, the name Eilabun comes from Arabic, meaning "hard, rocky ground." According to some scholars, Eilabun was built on the ancient site of "Ailabu", a possible variation of the name Ein Levon.

History
Pottery remains from the Middle Bronze Age, Iron Age II,   Persian, early Roman and from the Byzantine era have been excavated. Rock-cut sarcophagi have been found to the west of the village.

Elibabun is mentioned as one of the cities associated with one of the twenty-four priestly divisions, the residence of the priestly clan known as Haqoṣ. A stone inscription mentioning the town was discovered in Yemen by orientalist, Walter W. Muller, in 1970, and is believed to have been part of a ruined synagogue, now turned mosque.

In 2013, excavations were conducted in Eilabun by Gilad Cinamon on behalf of the Israel Antiquities Authority (IAA), during which time remains from the Mamluk era were discovered.

Ottoman period
In 1517, the village was incorporated into the Ottoman Empire with the rest of Palestine, and in 1596 it appeared in the Ottoman tax registers as being in the nahiya ("Subdistrict") of Tabariyya, part of Safad Sanjak,  with a population of 13 Muslim households. The villagers paid a fixed tax rate of 25% on various agricultural products, including wheat, barley, summer crops, olive trees, cotton, goats and bee hives, in addition to occasional revenues and a tax for a press for olive oil press or grape syrup; a total of 4,500 akçe.

According to a local tradition cited by Emanuel Hareuveni, Arab Christians from the neighbouring Christian village of Deir Hanna settled in Eilabun during the 19th century.

In 1838, Aleibun was noted as a Christian village in the Esh Shagur district, which was located between Safad, Acca and Tiberias.

In 1875, the French explorer Victor Guérin  found that the village had a population of about 100 Greek Christians, with a "humble" chapel. He noted an excellent water source, and remains (including columns) of old buildings. 

In 1881, the PEF's Survey of Western Palestine (SWP)  described it as "a stone village, well built, containing about 100 Christians. It is situated on a ridge, surrounded by brushwood, with arable land in the valley. A good spring exists to the west of the village."

A population list from about 1887 showed that Ailbun had about 210  inhabitants; all Catholic Christians.

British Mandate
In the 1922 census of Palestine, conducted by the British Mandate authorities, Ailabun had a total population of 319, all Christian, increasing in the 1931 census to 404, 32 Muslims and 372 Christians, in a total of 85 houses.
 
In  the  1945 statistics, the population comprised 530 Christians and 20 Muslims, who owned a total of 11,190 dunams of land, while 3,522 dunams of land was public.  Of this, 1,209 dunams were for plantations and irrigable land,  2,187 for cereals, while 18 dunams were built-up land.

Israel
Israel's Golani Brigade's 12th Battalion captured Eilabun on October 30, 1948—during the 1948 Arab-Israeli War, from the Arab Liberation Army (ALA). After the town's surrender, negotiated by four priests, the commander of the Golani troops selected 13–14 young Arab men of the 'Arab al-Mawasi Bedouin tribe and had them executed, in what became known as the Eilabun massacre, the point being to compel the rest of the tribe to leave. According to historian Benny Morris, those executed were Christians, and the executions were "apparently precipitated by the occupying troops' discovery of the decapitated bodies and one or both heads of two Israeli soldiers captured by ALA troops a month before,"     The village was then looted. Most of the town's residents were marched out to the Lebanese border, while hundreds fled to nearby gullies, caves and villages. As part of an agreement between Archbishop Hakim and the leader of the "Arab Section" in the Israeli Foreign Ministry, the Eliabun exiles in Lebanon were allowed to return in summer of 1949. The village remained under Martial Law until 1966.

On 25 April 2008, six people were injured, two of them sustaining serious wounds, in a brawl which broke out between Druze and Christians near Eilabun. The sectarian conflict was a part of the long running feud between the communities, which began in 2004 in the city of Shefa-'Amr. The April 2008 clash began for an unknown reason as members of the Druze community marched towards the grave site of Jethro, Moses' father-in-law, walking on the main road near the village of Eilabun. The marchers fought with the village residents using guns and stones. The Druze community elders who were present at the scene managed to restore calm. The conflict ended following an official reconciliation between the Druze and Christians in 2009.

Eilabun in film
The Sons of Eilaboun is a 2007 documentary film by Palestinian artist and film maker Hisham Zreiq, that tells the story of the Eilabun massacre, which was committed by the Israeli army during Operation Hiram in October 1948.

Notable people

 Hana Sweid

See also
Arab localities in Israel
Arab citizens of Israel
Christianity in Israel

References

Bibliography

External links
 Eilaboun official Website
Welcome To Eilabun
Survey of Western Palestine, Map 6: IAA, Wikimedia commons 

District of Tiberias
Arab localities in Israel
Arab Christian communities in Israel
Local councils in Northern District (Israel)